Lo-Fi Resistance is a project of guitarist, vocalist, and songwriter Randy McStine. Formed in 2009, Lo-Fi Resistance has released two albums with many different guest features. The first album, "A Deep Breath," features guest musicians such as Nick D'Virgilio of Spock's Beard and Doug Pinnick of King's X. The second album, "Chalk Lines," featured Gavin Harrison and Colin Edwin of Porcupine Tree, John Giblin of Kate Bush, and Dave Kerzner, formerly of Sound of Contact.

McStine is also a member of many collaborative projects, including; In Continuum (a prog/symphonic rock group led by Dave Kerzner (keyboards, vocals) and also featuring Gabriel Agudo (vocals), Marco Minnemann (drums), Matt Dorsey (bass) and McStine (guitar)), McStine & Minnemann (with drummer and multi-instrumentalist Marco Minnemann), and The Fringe, a supergroup with Nick D'Virgillio (drums, vocals) of Spock's Beard, and Jonas Reingold (bass, backing vocals) of many Swedish prog bands including The Flower Kings and Kaipa and also as touring bassist for Steve Hackett. 

In 2019 McStine did a tour as an opening act for The Pineapple Thief, a progressive rock band that then former Porcupine Tree collaborator Gavin Harrison on drums.

In 2022 it was announced that McStine and Nathan Navarro became the touring guitarist and bassist, respectively, for a reformed Porcupine Tree, replacing frequent collaborator, John Wesley, who didn't return to the band for personal reasons.

Discography 
Lo-Fi Resistance albums
A Deep Breath (2010)
Chalk Lines (2012, Burning Shed)
The Age Of Entitlement (2014)
Randy McStine solo releases

 Guitarizm (2005)
 Blank (2017)
 CDR EP 2019 (2019)
 Adopted Son - Live In Vancouver (2020)

Collaborations 

 The Fringe - The Fringe (2016)
 In Continuum - Acceleration Theory (2019)
 In Continuum - Acceleration Theory Part Two: Annihilation (2019)
 McStine & Minnemann - I (2020)
 McStine & Minnemann - II (2020)
 In Continuum - Acceleration Theory Deluxe Edition (2022)

Appearances

 Circuline - Return (2015)
 Circuline - Counterpoint (2016)
 Dave Kerzner - New World Live (2016)
 Dave Kerzner - Static (2017)
 Various - Yesterday And Today - A 50TH Anniversary Tribute To Yes (2018)
 Laura Meade - Remedium (2018)
 Adam Holzman - Truth Decay (2018)
 Vinnie Moore - Soul Shifter (2019)
 Marco Minnemann - My Sister (2019)
 The Backstage - Isolation (2020)
 The McBroom Sisters - Black Floyd (2020)
 Nick D'Virgilio - Invisible (2020)
 dUg Pinnick - Joy Bomb (2021)
 Jane Getter Premonition - Anomalia (2021)
 Charlie Benante - Silver Linings (2021)
 Ryo Okumoto - The Myth Of The Mostrophus (2022)

References

External links
 Official Website
 MySpace page

Alternative rock groups from New York (state)
Progressive rock musical groups from New York (state)
Musical groups established in 2009